The Santa Ana Unified School District (SAUSD) is a school district in Orange County, California that serves most of the city of Santa Ana and small portions of the cities of Irvine, Tustin, Costa Mesa and Newport Beach.  Although its geographic size is only , it is the 12th largest school district in the state of California with approximately 44,102 students.  The school district employs approximately 4,500 staff, and its operating budget is $483.1 million.

Ethnic makeup
93.1% 	Latino
3.0% 	Asian/Pacific Islander/Filipino
2.8% 	White
0.5% 	African American
0.1% 	Native American
0.5% 	Other

Schools

Elementary schools

Intermediate schools

High schools
Century High School
Cesar E. Chavez High School
Godinez Fundamental High School
Lorin Griset Academy
Middle College High School
Saddleback High School
Santa Ana High School
Segerstrom High School
Valley High School

Alternative Schools & Programs
Community Day High School & Intermediate School
Independent Study Program
Mitchell Child Development Center
Cal SAFE

Police Department
The Santa Ana Unified School District Police Department is the 2nd largest school police agency in California with 30 sworn officers, 41 civilian safety officers, 6 dispatchers, and 3 full-time administrative personnel. The department is the primary law enforcement agency to the school district. The Santa Ana School Police Department is an approved law enforcement agency in accordance to Commission on Peace Officer Standards and Training (P.O.S.T.). Santa Ana School Police officers get their peace officer status from California Penal Code, Section 830.32(b).

Charter Dispute with OCSA 
In early 2019, charter-holder Santa Ana Unified School District (SAUSD) threatened not to renew the Orange County School of the Arts' (OCSA) charter over a claim of an alleged misallocation of $19,000,000 in Special Education funding as well as an additional claim that OCSA's existing admissions practices were discriminatory and resulted in a student body did not represent demographics of Santa Ana's largely Hispanic neighborhoods.

Principal Dr. Ralph Opacic defended OCSA by saying,"We are the Orange County School of the Arts, not the Santa Ana School of the Arts. The blame for not serving more Santa Ana students is misplaced. Santa Ana Unified should be working harder to provide more arts-rich experiences for kids, so they discover and follow that pathway"In early 2020, OCSA brought their case to the Orange County Board of Education (OCBE), and asked for the OCBE to renew their charter instead, and on March 4, 2020, The Orange County Board of Education voted to renew the school's five year charter, resulting in the forfeiture of SAUSD's governing rights over OCSA as a school in their district.

SAUSD was to remain governing over OCSA until June 30, 2020, and on July 1, the Orange County Board of Education gained control over the school.

As of the 2020-2021 school year, OCSA has instituted new admissions requirements involving "auditions" being replaced with "placement activities" to determine if potential students are a fit for the conservatories they have applied to. If there are too many applications accepted, an admissions lottery will be instituted.

See also

List of school districts in Orange County, California

References

External links

School districts in Orange County, California
Education in Santa Ana, California